The Country Club at Wakefield Plantation is a private golf club located within the planned community of Wakefield Plantation in Raleigh, North Carolina. Formerly named TPC Wakefield Plantation as a member of the Tournament Players Club network operated by the PGA Tour, it was purchased by McConnell Golf in 2011.

The Hale Irwin designed championship golf course, built adjacent to Falls Lake, opened in 2000. It is accompanied by a par 33, 9-hole course.

The Country Club at Wakefield Plantation is the home of the Rex Hospital Open, formerly the SAS Carolina Classic, a tournament on the second tier Web.com Tour.

Sports Club

The Country Club at Wakefield Plantation Sports Club offers three swimming pools: an eight-lane Olympic-style pool, a recreational pool with water slide and a "kiddie" pool, eight state-of-the-art hydro-clay tennis courts, children's playground, 9-hole practice golf course, casual bar & grill, fitness center, locker rooms and showers, covered outdoor party area, and shade pavilion.

References

External links

Golf clubs and courses in North Carolina
Sports venues in Raleigh, North Carolina
Organizations based in Raleigh, North Carolina
2000 establishments in North Carolina
Sports venues completed in 2000